WTVS (channel 56) is a PBS member television station in Detroit, Michigan, United States, owned by the Detroit Educational Television Foundation. Its main studios are located at the Riley Broadcast Center and HD Studios in Wixom, with an additional studio at the Maccabees Building in Midtown Detroit. The station's transmitter is located at 8 Mile and Meyers Road in Oak Park (on a tower shared with independent station WMYD, channel 20, and CBS owned-and-operated station WWJ-TV, channel 62). WTVS partners with the Stanley and Judith Frankel Family Foundation in the management of classical and jazz music station WRCJ-FM (90.9).

History
The station first signed on the air on October 3, 1955; WTVS began broadcasting in color in 1968. The studios were originally located at 9345 Lawton in Detroit, along with the studios of WRCJ; WTVS moved to the former WJBK studio facility in the New Center area of Detroit in 1971. WTVS vacated the facility in the 1990s, and the building would  be used for its fixed satellite services until 2009, when it was sold to the Mosaic Youth Theatre of Detroit; it is currently being reconstructed for use as headquarters for the non-profit Midnight Golf Program. Prior to the digital TV switchover, WTVS transmitted its signal from a  tower located near the intersection of 11 Mile and Inkster Roads in Southfield, along with WMYD (channel 20) and CW O&O WKBD-TV (channel 50). Today, only WKBD-TV and Ion Television affiliate WPXD-TV (channel 31) broadcast from that tower.

On January 11, 2016, Detroit Public Television announced a partnership with WKAR, the PBS station serving Mid-Michigan operated by Michigan State University, in which they will jointly operate a 24-hour children's television service to be carried by both stations.

Programming 
Locally produced programming on the station includes Great Lakes Now, Get Up! Get Out, In the Frame: Exploring the DIA, Leaders on Leadership, American Black Journal and Am I Right. WTVS is also a leading producer of fundraising programs for PBS.  In the 1990s this station produced Club Connect.

In addition to locally produced programming, Detroit PBS also is the sole creator of all Il Volo (popular Italian singing group) concert DVDs and related CDs. The Detroit PBS Il Volo concerts were the October 2011 "Il Volo Takes Flight - Live from the Detroit Opera House", the March 2013 "Il Volo at the Miami Fillmore - We Are Love" concert, the March 2013 "Il Volo at the Miami Fillmore - Buon Natale" concert, the June 2015 "Il Volo - Live at Pompeii" concert, and July 2016 Il Volo - "Tribute to the 3 Tenors - in Florence" concert.

Controversy
In 2005, WTVS declined to air the controversial Postcards from Buster episode "Sugartime!", even after the show's Boston-based producing station, WGBH, converted it to the status of being specifically shown to individual stations. The decision was made after PBS received a complaint from then-newly-appointed Education Secretary Margaret Spellings, who was upset its storyline, in which the main character, Buster Baxter, pays a visit to Hinesburg, Vermont, to learn how maple sugar is made, and interacts with several children who have lesbian parents. The controversy surrounding the episode let to it being removed from PBS Kids Go!'s national broadcast schedule.

Technical information

Subchannels
The station's digital signal is multiplexed:

Many newer television receivers also list WTVS subchannels 43.177 and 43.193. These subchannels are artifact channels from the UpdateTV service.

WTVS also has plans for a Mobile DTV feed of subchannel 56.1.

Analog-to-digital conversion
WTVS became the first public broadcaster in the state of Michigan to offer a digital high-definition feed, launching their simulcast on UHF 43 in October 2000 (exact date not yet known). The station shut down its analog signal, over UHF channel 56, at noon on April 16, 2009; the switchover occurred after a presentation of the national anthems of Canada ("O Canada") and the United States ("The Star-Spangled Banner"). WTVS management cited repeated failures of the station's 28-year-old analog transmitter as the reason for ceasing its analog signal on April 16 rather than the June 12 transition date for full-power stations (the analog transmitter had failed seven times between January 1 and April 16 alone). The station's digital signal continued to broadcasts on its pre-transition UHF channel 43. Through the use of PSIP, digital television receivers display the station's virtual channel as its former UHF analog channel 56, which was among the high band UHF channels (52-69) that were removed from broadcasting use as a result of the transition.

On October 12, 2009, WTVS upgraded to a new 600 kW transmitter, tripling its effective radiated power and vastly increasing the coverage area of its signal.

On January 13, 2017, WTVS re-organized its digital subchannels when it added PBS Kids as a full-time 24/7 subchannel on 56.2, with PBS World moving to 56.4.  This was in part of WTVS' larger plan of launching a statewide PBS Kids subchannel network in partnership with other PBS member stations within the state of Michigan, such as Lansing's WKAR-TV and Flint's WCMZ-TV.

On March 8, 2017, WTVS announced it would be moving its digital broadcast frequency from UHF Channel 43 to UHF channel 20 (currently occupied by WHNE-LD Channel 14), which was assigned VHF channel 3 as a replacement frequency.

Cable coverage
WTVS is carried on most cable television providers in Southeast Michigan, Southwestern Ontario and parts of the British Columbia Southern Interior (WTVS is carried in that province despite the existence of KCTS-TV in Seattle, the PBS member station commonly found in that province). WTVS is one of five Detroit television stations available in Canada on cable through Shaw Broadcast Services and on satellite provider Shaw Direct; it began to be distributed by Cancom (now Shaw Broadcast Services) in 1983 as the PBS station signal for Canadian cable television systems too distant to receive a border station over-the-air. Since then, it had developed a strong base of Canadian viewer support in all provinces and territories.

See also

Media in Detroit

References

External links
WTVS official website

Television channels and stations established in 1955
PBS member stations
TVS
1955 establishments in Michigan